Euproctis baliolalis, the browntail gum moth, is a moth of the family Erebidae. The species was first described by Charles Swinhoe in 1892. It is found in the south-east quarter of Australia.

The wingspan is about 50 mm. Adults are hairy and brown, with a broad white band along the terminal area of each wing and a dark brown body.

The larvae feed on the foliage of Eucalyptus species. They are initially gregarious and feed only on the surface layer of leaves of their food plant. The hairs can cause skin irritation (urticaria) if the caterpillar is handled, particularly just prior to pupation. Pupation takes place between gum leaves in a woven cocoon under the bark.

External links
"Species Euproctis baliolalis (Swinhoe, 1892)". Australian Faunal Directory. Archived October 9, 2012.

Moths of Australia
Lymantriinae
Moths described in 1892